Ladykillers is a 1988 television film, directed by Robert Michael Lewis, and starring Lesley-Anne Down, Marilu Henner, Susan Blakely, and Keith David as Abe.  The film score was composed by Mark Snow.

The plot of this film is unconnected with The Ladykillers (1955) or the 2004 remake of the same name.

Plot

The plot has a male sexualization theme. Performers in a Los Angeles male strip club are being murdered by an unknown female assailant. Unable to gain a lead, investigating officer Lt. Cavanaugh goes undercover as a stripper in an attempt to trap the murderer, but he is almost killed in the process.  Through his journey as a male stripper, Cavanaugh gains a better understanding of his inner self, his emotional side and how his relationships with women tended to be one-sided fetish fests; taking him further down a darkened alley of misfortune.

External links

1988 films
1988 television films
1980s crime films
American television films
Crimes against sex workers in fiction
Fictional erotic dancers
Films scored by Mark Snow
Films set in Los Angeles
Male erotic dance
American police detective films
American serial killer films
Works about the sex industry
1980s English-language films
Films directed by Robert Michael Lewis
1980s American films
Crime television films